Ian Smith (1919–2007) was the Prime Minister of Rhodesia from 1964 to 1979.

Ian Smith or Iain Smith may also refer to:

Entertainment
 Iain Crichton Smith (1928–1998), Scottish poet and critic
 Ian Smith (actor) (born 1938), Australian actor
 Iain Smith (producer) (born 1949), Scottish film producer
 Ian Michael Smith (born 1987), American actor, technologist, and disability activist
 Ian Smith (comedian) (born 1988), English comedian
 Ian Smith (photographer), Scottish photographer
 Iain Campbell Smith, Australian diplomat, singer/songwriter, and comedian

Politics
 Ian Smith (Australian politician) (born 1939), Liberal Party
 Iain Duncan Smith (born 1954), British Conservative Party politician
 Iain Smith (Scottish politician) (born 1960), Liberal Democrat

Sports

Cricket
 Ian Smith (South African cricketer) (1925–2015)
 Ian Smith (New Zealand cricketer) (born 1957), player and commentator
 Ian Smith (English cricketer) (born 1967), played for Glamorgan and Durham

Football
 Ian Smith (footballer, born 1952), Scottish football forward for Queens Park, Birmingham City
 Ian Smith (footballer, born 1957), English football fullback for Tottenham Hotspur
 Ian Paul Smith (born 1976), English footballer for Burnley, Oldham Athletic
 Ian Smith (footballer, born 1998), Costa Rican footballer

Rugby
 Ian Smith (rugby union, born 1903) (1903–1972)
 Ian Smith (rugby union, born 1941) (1941–2017)
 Ian "Dosser" Smith (born 1957), English rugby player/coach
 Ian Smith (rugby league) (born 1965), Super League referee
 Ian Smith (rugby union, born 1965), rugby union coach

Others
 Ian William Murison Smith (1937–2016), professor of chemistry, University of Birmingham
 Ian Smith (impresario) (1939–2019), journalist, businessman, and impresario
 Iain R. Smith (born 1939), reader in history at the University of Warwick
 Ian K. Smith (born 1969), African-American physician
 Ian Smith (lobbyist), Australian businessman, corporate advisor and journalist
 Ian T. Smith, professor of employment law at the University of East Anglia